The 1948 United States presidential election in Oregon took place on November 2, 1948, as part of the 1948 United States presidential election. Voters chose six representatives, or electors, to the Electoral College, who voted for president and vice president.

Oregon was won by Governor Thomas Dewey (R–New York), running with Governor Earl Warren, with 49.78% of the popular vote, against incumbent President Harry S. Truman (D–Missouri), running with Senator Alben W. Barkley, with 46.40% of the popular vote.

Dewey’s victory was the first of four consecutive Republican victories in the state, as Oregon would not vote Democratic again until Lyndon B. Johnson’s 1964 landslide victory.

This was the last election until 1988 in which Oregon and California did not vote for the same candidate and, as of 2020, it has not happened again.

Results

Results by county

See also
 United States presidential elections in Oregon

References

Oregon
1948
1948 Oregon elections